Dobravica is a settlement in the Municipality of Ig in central Slovenia. The municipality is part of the traditional region of Inner Carniola and is now included in the Central Slovenia Statistical Region.

Church

The local church, built on a small hill in the centre of the settlement, is dedicated to Saint Gregory and belongs to the Parish of Ig. It is a Baroque church, built in the mid-18th century.

References

External links
Dobravica on Geopedia

Populated places in the Municipality of Ig